I Love Christmas may refer to:

I Love Christmas, album by Tommy James
"I Love Christmas", song from Bing Bang (Time to Dance)